Days Are Gone is the debut studio album by American pop rock band Haim, released on September 27, 2013, by Polydor Records. The album spawned six singles: "Forever", "Don't Save Me", "Falling", "The Wire", "If I Could Change Your Mind", and "My Song 5".

The album was recognized as one of "The 100 Best Albums of the Decade So Far" by Pitchfork in August 2014.

Background
The three women grew up in the San Fernando Valley, listening to the 1970s classic rock and Americana records of their music-loving parents. While they were still at school their parents formed a family band called Rockinhaim to play cover versions at local charity fairs, with Israeli-born father Mordechai ("Moti") on drums and mother Donna on guitar. Danielle and Este were members of the Valli Girls, an all-female band from Southern California that was signed to Columbia Records. Their song "Always There in You" was included on the soundtrack to the 2005 film The Sisterhood of the Traveling Pants, while "Valli Nation" appeared on the 2005 Kids' Choice Awards soundtrack. Shortly after the band's appearance at the 2005 Kids' Choice Awards, Este and Danielle opted out of their contracts.

As they grew older, the girls became more interested in incorporating pop and contemporary R&B into their music. In 2006 they decided to form their own band. For the next five years, Haim played local venues, but did not take things further as all three sisters were busy with other projects. Este was studying at UCLA and graduated in 2010 with a degree in Ethnomusicology, completed in two years instead of the customary five. Upon graduating from high school Danielle was asked to play drums for the opening act on one of Jenny Lewis's tours, which led to Lewis asking Danielle to be her guitarist on the following tour. The Strokes' singer Julian Casablancas came to see one of Lewis's shows on that tour, and he in turn asked Danielle to play guitar and percussion on his own solo tour. She has also toured as part of Scarlet Fever, the all-female backing band for CeeLo Green. It was after Danielle had played with other artists and Este had graduated that the sisters decided that they wanted pursue their career as Haim more seriously. Youngest sister Alana spent one year in college before dropping out to join the band with her sisters.

Having played shows supporting artists such as Edward Sharpe and the Magnetic Zeros, the Henry Clay People, and Kesha, Haim's first release was a three-song EP titled Forever which was made available on February 10, 2012, as a free download on their website for a brief period. The EP received a lot of attention from the music press and the general public, and following a successful gig at the South by Southwest festival in March 2012 Haim signed a deal with Polydor Records in the United Kingdom in June 2012. In July 2012 independent record label National Anthem released the Forever EP on 10-inch vinyl, containing the original three songs along with a fourth track, a remix of "Forever" by Dan Lissvik. All songs on the Forever EP were included on Days Are Gone, except for "Better Off".  Following dates supporting Mumford & Sons on their "Gentlemen of the Road" tour in the US in August 2012, Haim made their debut tour of the UK in November 2012 and then supported Florence and the Machine on their UK and Ireland tour in December 2012.

Singles
"Forever" was released as the lead single from the album on October 12, 2012. It peaked at No. 75 on the UK Singles Chart.

"Don't Save Me" was released as the second single from the album on November 8, 2012. It reached No. 32 on the UK Singles Chart, as well as No. 66 in Australia, No. 28 in Belgium (Flanders region), and No. 70 on the Irish Singles Chart.

"Falling" (co-written by Morgan Nagler) was released as the third single from the album on February 12, 2013. It peaked at No. 30 on the UK Singles Chart and No. 86 in Australia.

"The Wire" was released as the fourth single from the album on August 9, 2013. It peaked at No. 12 in Australia and No. 16 on the UK Singles Chart.

"If I Could Change Your Mind" was released as the fifth single from the album on March 21, 2014. It reached No. 27 on the UK Singles Chart.

"My Song 5" was released as the sixth and final single from the album on August 15, 2014.

Critical reception

Days Are Gone received generally positive reviews from music critics. At Metacritic, which assigns a normalized rating out of 100 to reviews from mainstream publications, the album received an average score of 79, based on 35 reviews. Ann Powers from NPR stated "HAIM's thoughtful, playful music is good for the radio, good for rock, and good for music lovers of all ages who need to carve out a little space to dream." Becca James of The A.V. Club gave the album a very positive review: "It could be an overstatement to say that if Days Are Gone is any indication of what's to come for Haim, the band is set." Matt James of PopMatters complimented all overall production, stating, "It'd be hard to truly dislike Haim. They're an eminently likeable, albeit slightly kooky, trio whose story already bears the frisson of legend. Three multi-talented siblings—Danielle, Alana and Este—who were baptised in the dark arts of rock 'n' roll by their own parents" and added [...] "It's not revolutionary, life-changing 'high art' but right here, right now Haim's sassy, enthusiastic, 'one for all' joie de vivre feels freshly invigorating, infectious ...basically, a drop o' the good stuff."

Jon Caramanica of The New York Times hailed the synthesized and the hooked production and compared the girls to the early years of Madonna, Pat Benatar, Sheena Easton and Laura Branigan: "There's the slightly sinister bubblyness of early Madonna, the erotic power of Pat Benatar, the breathlessness of Sheena Easton or Laura Branigan", and continued, "Haim lashes all of these together with force and glee, a rapturous throwback. Days Are Gone is as convincing as any major-label rock album this year, especially its first half, which is slick, confident and winningly breezy."<ref>{{cite web|url=https://www.nytimes.com/2013/10/01/arts/music/the-blow-and-haim-release-new-albums.html/|title=The Blow and Haim Releases New Albums New York Times |work=The New York Times |last=Caramanica |first=Jon |date=September 30, 2013|access-date=October 3, 2013}}</ref> Jody Rosen of Vulture praised the album's fusion of "everything from the Doobie Brothers to Janet Jackson to third-wave feminism" combined with "catchy four-minute-long songs." Jon Dolan of Rolling Stone wrote that it "recalls the dancy side of Eighties Top 40 radio as an AstroTurf Eden of chewy synths, neon-cheese guitar quake and slick, airy melodies." In a less enthusiastic review, Andy Gill of The Independent felt that the band has an "insubstantiality at their core." Philip Matusavage of musicOMH gave a mixed review, commenting, "Stretched to album length, Haim's shtick grows repetitive and the music is too frequently solid rather than inspired".

AccoladesStereogum ranked Days Are Gone at No. 8 on their "The 50 Best Albums of 2013" list, stating: "On their debut album, [Haim] bring Stevie Nicks float, Michael Jackson glide, and Debbie Gibson twinkle to the table, subsuming them all into the massive force of their collective personality. They're not indie, but if they were, indie would be lucky to have them."

Commercial performanceDays Are Gone entered the Billboard 200 at number six with first-week sales of 26,000 copies. The album debuted at number one on the UK Albums Chart, selling 37,005 copies in its first week. On October 25, 2013, the album was certified silver by the British Phonographic Industry (BPI), denoting shipments of over 60,000 copies in the UK, and on December 27, 2013, was certified gold denoting shipments of over 100,000 copies. As of July 2017, the album had sold 300,244 copies in the United Kingdom.

Track listing

Notes
  signifies an additional lyricist
  signifies an additional producer
  signifies a remixer

Personnel
Credits adapted from the liner notes of Days Are Gone''.

Haim
 Danielle Haim – guitar, vocals, drums ; percussion 
 Alana Haim – guitar ; piano ; synthesizer ; percussion ; vocals ; keyboards 
 Este Haim – bass, vocals ; percussion

Additional musicians
 Ariel Rechtshaid – synthesizer ; programming ; guitar ; backing vocals ; Simmons drums ; Rhodes ; mbira, noise 
 Will Canzoneri – clavinet, Rhodes 
 James Ford – keyboards ; percussion ; guitar 
 Jamie Muhoberac – additional keyboards 
 Greg Leisz – pedal steel guitar

Technical

 Ariel Rechtshaid – production, engineering ; additional production, additional engineering 
 Danielle Haim – production 
 Alana Haim – production 
 Este Haim – production 
 Ludwig Göransson – production 
 James Ford – production 
 David Schiffman – engineering 
 Nick Rowe – additional engineering 
 Jimmy Robertson – engineering 
 Morgan Stratton – engineering 
 Mark "Spike" Stent – mixing 
 Geoff Swan – mixing assistance 
 Dave Emery – mixing assistance 
 Tom Elmhirst – mixing 
 Ben Baptie – mixing assistance 
 Manny Marroquin – mixing 
 Chris Galland – mixing assistance 
 Delbert Bowers – mixing assistance 
 Rich Costey – mixing 
 Chris Kasych – mix engineering 
 Nicolas Fournier – mix engineering 
 Martin Cooke – mix engineering 
 Bo Hill – engineering assistance 
 Heiko Huebschmann – mixing 
 Emily Lazar – mastering 
 Rich Morales – mastering assistance

Artwork
 Big Active – design
 Marek Polewski – design
 Pierre Auroux – photography
 Tom Beard – photography

Charts

Weekly charts

Year-end charts

Certifications

Release history

Notes

References

External links
 

2013 debut albums
Albums produced by Ariel Rechtshaid
Albums produced by James Ford (musician)
Albums recorded at Electro-Vox Recording Studios
Columbia Records albums
Haim (band) albums
Polydor Records albums